Sawtelle may refer to:

 Cullen Sawtelle
 William Henry Sawtelle
 Sawtelle, Los Angeles
 Sawtelle Boulevard
 Sawtelle Veterans Home
 Sawtelle (Pacific Electric)

See also

 Sawtell (disambiguation)